Rubén Martínez Granja (born 8 December 1989) is a Spanish professional footballer who plays as a left winger for Greek Super League club Lamia.

Club career
Born in Mahón, Menorca, Balearic Islands, Martínez finished his formation with FC Barcelona. He made his senior debut with Atlético Malagueño in the 2008–09 season, in Tercera División.

Martínez first arrived in Segunda División B in August 2010, with Alicante CF. He continued to appear in the division in the following years, representing Celta de Vigo B, CD Alcoyano, UE Sant Andreu, La Hoya Lorca CF, UE Llagostera, UD Melilla and UD Logroñés; with the latter he achieved promotion to Segunda División in 2020, contributing with five goals in 27 appearances (play-offs included).

Martínez made his professional debut on 12 September 2020, starting in a 0–1 away loss against Sporting de Gijón. His first professional goal occurred the following 9 May, but in a 4–1 loss at Girona FC.

On 11 August 2021, after Logroñés' relegation, Martínez signed a one-year contract with Albacete Balompié, also relegated to Primera División RFEF. He scored a career-best 11 goals during his first season, as Alba returned to the second division at first attempt.

On 19 December 2022, Martínez moved abroad for the first time in his career, after joining Super League Greece side PAS Lamia 1964.

References

External links

1989 births
Living people
People from Mahón
Spanish footballers
Footballers from Menorca
Association football wingers
Segunda División players
Primera Federación players
Segunda División B players
Tercera División players
Atlético Malagueño players
CE Premià players
Celta de Vigo B players
CD Alcoyano footballers
Alicante CF footballers
UE Sant Andreu footballers
Lorca FC players
UE Costa Brava players
UD Melilla footballers
UD Logroñés players
Albacete Balompié players
PAS Lamia 1964 players
Spanish expatriate footballers
Spanish expatriate sportspeople in Greece
Expatriate footballers in Greece